Incisura lytteltonensis is a species of sea snail, a keyhole limpet, a marine gastropod mollusc in the family Scissurellidae.

Distribution
This marine species occurs off New Zealand.

References
Notes

Sources
 Powell A. W. B., New Zealand Mollusca, William Collins Publishers Ltd, Auckland, New Zealand 1979 
 Wilson, B. (1993). Australian Marine Shells. Prosobranch Gastropods. Kallaroo, WA : Odyssey Publishing. Vol.1 1st Edn

External links
 

Scissurellidae
Gastropods of New Zealand
Gastropods described in 1894